Dismorphia medora, the Medora mimic white is a butterfly in the family Pieridae. It is found in Colombia, Ecuador and Peru.

Subspecies
The following subspecies are recognised:
Dismorphia medora medora (Colombia)
Dismorphia medora lilianna Lamas, 2004 (Ecuador)
Dismorphia medora juditha Lamas, 2004 (Peru)

References

Dismorphiinae
Butterflies described in 1844
Pieridae of South America